Adelbold I (or Odilbald) was a bishop of Utrecht from 867/879 to 898.

Just like his predecessors and successors, Adelbold resided in Deventer because Utrecht was still threatened by Viking raids. A few times he acted as arbiter in matters at Cologne, and he visited the Synods at Cologne in 873 and 887, and the Synod at Trebur in 895. Adelbold was buried in the St. Salvator Church in Utrecht.

898 deaths
Bishops of Utrecht
Bishops in the Carolingian Empire
Year of birth unknown
9th-century Lotharingian people